Mametz is a former commune in the Somme department in Hauts-de-France in northern France. On 1 January 2019, it was merged into the new commune Carnoy-Mametz.

Geography
Fricourt lies to the west, Contalmaison is to the north, Montauban-de-Picardie to the north-east and Carnoy and Maricourt are to the south-east. Mametz Wood is 1,000 yards (910 m) to the north-west.

History

In the First World War, the area was the site of intense and sustained fighting between German and Allied forces. Between 1914 and 1916, the Western Front ran through Mametz, and the area was devastated. In 1916, Mametz was the site of particularly heavy fighting during the Battle of the Somme (see Capture of Mametz). It was also one of the sites where British mines were exploded on the first day of that battle. After the Armistice of 11 November 1918, the former inhabitants returned and gradually rebuilt most of the infrastructure as it had been before the war. There is a memorial in the commune to the 38th (Welsh) Division at Mametz Wood.

Population

See also
 Communes of the Somme department
 The Welsh at Mametz Wood (painting)

References

External links

 Mametz on the Quid website 

Former communes of Somme (department)
Populated places disestablished in 2019